Milarepa's Cave may refer to any of the numerous caves in the Himalayas used by Tibetan siddha Milarepa as hermitage.

 Milarepa's Cave, Nyalam, Tibet, China
 Milarepa Cave, Gandaki, Nepal